is an island within the Okinawa Islands, administered by Motobu, Kunigami District, Okinawa Prefecture, Japan.

Okinawa Islands
Tourist attractions in Okinawa Prefecture
Islands of Okinawa Prefecture